"Frozen" is the first single of the Dutch symphonic metal band Delain. It was released on 8 January 2007 by Roadrunner Records.

Charts

Track listing
 "Frozen" – 4:01	
 "(Deep) Frozen" – 4:42	
 "Frozen Video Clip"

Personnel
Charlotte Wessels – vocals
Ronald Landa – guitars
Ray van Lente – guitars
Ad Sluijter - guitar solo
Rob van der Loo – bass
Martijn Westerholt – keyboards
Sander Zoer – drums

References

2007 singles
Songs written by Charlotte Wessels
Songs written by Martijn Westerholt
Delain songs
2006 songs
Roadrunner Records singles